The A344 highway is a highway in Nigeria. It is one of the east-west roads linking the main south-north roads. (It is named from the two highways it links).

It runs from the A3 highway at Aliade, Benue State to the A4 highway south of  Katsina-Ala. The main city on the route is Gboko.

References

Highways in Nigeria